O'Conner is a variant form of the Irish surname O'Connor.

Notable people with this name
Elizabeth O'Conner (1913–2000), Australian novelist, born Barbara Willard Lowe
Pat O'Conner (born 1958), American Minor League Baseball executive
Patricia T. O'Conner (born 1949), American author of books on English

Fictional characters
Brian O'Conner in The Fast and the Furious film series

See also
O'Connor